The 2003 World Orienteering Championships, the 20th World Orienteering Championships, were held in Rapperswil and Jona, Switzerland, 3 –9 August 2003.

The championships had eight events; sprint for men and women, middle distance for men and women, long distance (formerly called individual or classic distance) for men and women, and relays for men and women.

Medalists

Results

Women's long distance

References 

World Orienteering Championships
2003 in Swiss sport
International sports competitions hosted by Switzerland
August 2003 sports events in Europe
Orienteering in Switzerland
Rapperswil-Jona